The Journal of Management is a peer-reviewed academic journal published by SAGE Publications for the Southern Management Association and covering research on all aspects of management as well as the related field of industrial and organizational psychology. Special issues containing review articles only are published biannually in January and July. It is an official journal of the Southern Management Association. The journal was established in 1975 and the editor-in-chief is Brian L. Connelly (Auburn University).

Abstracting and indexing 
The journal is abstracted and indexed in:

According to the Journal Citation Reports the journal has a 2017 impact factor of 8.08.

References

External links 

Publications established in 1975
Business and management journals
SAGE Publishing academic journals
Bimonthly journals
English-language journals
8 times per year journals